Collinée (Gallo: Coètneiz) is a former commune in the Côtes-d'Armor department of Brittany in northwestern France. On , it was merged into the new commune Le Mené.

Population

Inhabitants of Collinée are called Collinéens in French.

See also
Communes of the Côtes-d'Armor department

References

External links

Former communes of Côtes-d'Armor